Huntington is home to eleven parks located in the neighborhoods of Huntington. An amusement park is also adjacent to the city.

Walking/Biking trails 
The 18-mile network of recreational trails, popularly known as the PATH, has been in development since 2007.

Greater Huntington Park & Recreation District

Altizer Park 
Located in the Altizer area of Huntington at the easternmost end of Altizer Avenue.
It has a baseball field adjacent to it. It also features a trampoline and an orange rocket ship for children to play on.

Camp Mad Anthony Wayne 
Camp Mad Anthony Wayne is located on Spring Valley Drive. Named for "Mad" Anthony Wayne, who was a frontier army general, it contains vast open grounds, swings and sliding boards, hiking trails, a disc golf course, numerous picnic tables, an open campfire circle, and a lodge. The facility sleeps 28 and contains a bathroom and shower facilities. It is host to two large wood-fired fireplaces.

Part of the park was listed on the National Register of Historic Places in 2002.  The eight historic buildings are the camp lodge building (1931), four nearly identical gable roofed, stone, rustic vernacular cottages dated to 1942; a gable-roofed, stone, rustic vernacular caretaker's house and two associated outbuildings, dated to 1944. The camp lodge building is a gable-roofed, brick, rustic vernacular building.

Harris Riverfront Park 
After years of sluggish usage from the general public of Huntington and the Tri-State area, Harris Riverfront Park has seen a renewed interest in recent years from local citizens, city government, media and local businesses. The public land continues to host a number of concert and music events, recently re-introduced a free open-air movie showing, and has been included in citywide construction of additional surveillance cameras which will provide free public-access wireless internet connections.

The park is situated between the city flood wall and the Ohio River, and is noted for its scenic riverview and grassy recreational area.

Harveytown Park 
Harveytown Park is one of the newest parks in the Harveytown district. It features currently six picnic tables, one of which is handicap accessible, an electrical outlet, a grill, water fountain, and restrooms.

Construction on Phase I of the new park began on October 28, 2003. The financing and coordination was a joint effort between the city of Huntington, HUD CDBG funds, and the Greater Huntington Park and Recreation District. During Phase I, the initial park site was cleared and prepared, underground utilities were installed, a main entrance and parking lot was constructed, and the picnic shelter was installed. The shelter was unique in that it was both aesthetically pleasing and functional.

Possible expansion plans include a skateboard facility, bicycle trails and tennis courts.

McClelland Park 
McClelland Park is located along the Ohio River near St. Mary's Hospital. It is named after James L. McClelland, the Greater Huntington Park and Recreation District director. It features two tennis courts, a basketball court, and a picnic shelter. It was formerly named the 27th Street Park, named for the street it lies on.

Memorial Park 
Memorial Park is located at 1301 Memorial Boulevard. It contains The Memorial Arch, a section of the PATH walking trail, a playground, and a picnic shelter. It formerly included a large swimming pool that featured two slides, but was abandoned and demolished in 2006. The two-mile walking trail merges with the one-mile trail around the main Ritter Park at 8th Street & North Blvd.

RPA Park 
RPA Park is located on Spring Valley Drive on the west end of the city. It features a basketball court and a children's playground. It is home to the annual "Valley Ball 3-on-3 Tournament."

Ritter Park 

Ritter Park is located in Huntington, West Virginia. It is a public park maintained by the Greater Huntington Park and Recreation District. It was created in 1913 by Rufus Switzer, a city council member of West Virginia. It consists of numerous lengthy walking trails along Four Pole Creek, restroom facilities, picnic tables, shelter with grills and electrical outlets, a children's playground, amphitheater that can be used for small concerts and plays, and an award-winning Rose Garden. The park was officially opened in September 1913. Architect Gus Wofford was hired by the city to design the park and its amenities. His works continued till the 1930s and includes bridges that cross streams, tennis courts, greenhouse, and picnic facilities. It is located in the Ritter Park Historic District, listed on the National Register of Historic Places in 1990.

Ritter Park is one of the 2012 Great Places of America listed by American Planning Association (APA).  Every year APA selects great places having true sense of place, culture and historic interest, community involvement, and a vision for tomorrow. The list of “APA Great Places” is a very useful and informative source for local residents and tourists who are looking for an enjoyable public place. Ritter Park is one of the busiest places in Huntington, but still maintaining its peaceful and serene environment.

The award-winning Rose Garden and the playground are the most popular amenities of the Ritter Park that attracts tourists. The internationally known Rose Garden, including the "Room with a View" is popular for weddings and special occasions. The Rose Garden has more than 3,500 rose plants. The garden bordered by stone walls is designed to place benches for the events. In addition to the weddings, the annual Rose Show and the Summer Nature Programs are presented here. Each year the roses are tested and provided by the American Rose Society.

The playground in the park has been rated sixth best nationally by “Child Magazine.” The structures in the playground are designed to look naturalistic and include climbing boulders, dinosaur sand pit, swings, and slides.  The playground is situated on the site of the former Lake Chaposcane   The park also provides a non-motorized roadway for bicyclists, skaters, strollers, walkers, wheelchairs and joggers. The amphitheater, accommodates approximately 1,500 people, is popular for events, shows, musical concerts, summer programs, dramas, reunions, and weddings.

It is also the location of the Ritter Park Tennis Facility. This facility is open to the public and has eleven outdoor tennis courts and four indoor courts. The Ritter Park Tennis Center is host to many tournaments including: Huntington Area Qualifier, Ohio Valley Boys 16 & Under Championships, Ohio Valley Boys 12 & Under Indoor Championships and WV Open Indoor Championships. The facility also offers a wide range of instructional programs for the beginner to advanced player. Ritter park is also where the great Jeff Morrsion played his junior tennis before becoming a professional tennis player.

Some of the special events that have occurred in Ritter Park are:

•	Annual Ritter Park Easter Egg Hunt held since 1935.

•	Residents bring their dogs for pledge walk, Walk and Wag 5K, in May.

•	Graffiti in the Park Car Show in June showcases hundreds of antique automobiles.

•	Huntington Art and Music Festival held in August.

•	Numerous tennis tournaments including West Virginia Open Indoor event in December.

Rotary Park 
Rotary Park offers two disc golf courses.

St. Cloud Commons

Veteran's Memorial Park

Westmoreland Park

Amusement parks

Camden Park 
Huntington is also home to Camden Park, the state's only remaining amusement park. Marshall Cox is the current owner/manager of the property. It features numerous children attractions and The Big Dipper, its primary roller-coaster. Camden Park is located just west of the Westmoreland neighborhood in Wayne County along US 60.

Stadiums

St. Cloud Commons 
St. Cloud Commons is a stadium in Huntington.  It is primarily used for baseball and was the home of Huntington Cubs.  The ballpark has a capacity of 3,100 people and opened in the early 20th century. The Huntington Cubs first season was 1990. The field was upgraded to a point for the Huntington Cubs but the lack of commitment from the city of Huntington and the local park board pushed the Chicago Cubs organization to move the team elsewhere. The field is now used by the Greater Huntington Park and Recreation District for their recreational adult softball league. The field was and still is notable for being affected by flooding. There is a drainage basin that runs along the southern border of the entire St. Cloud Commons park area.

References

External links 
 Greater Huntington Park and Recreation District official site
https://visithuntingtonwv.org/things-to-do/explore/recreation/
 Great Places in America, American Planning Association

Urban public parks
Sports venues in West Virginia
Minor league baseball venues
Huntington, West Virginia
Protected areas of Cabell County, West Virginia
Tourist attractions in Cabell County, West Virginia